Moritz  is the German equivalent of the name Maurice. It may refer to:

People

Given name 
 Saint Maurice, also called Saint Moritz, the leader of the legendary Roman Theban Legion in the 3rd century
 Prince Moritz of Hesse (2007), the son of Donatus, Prince and Landgrave of Hesse
 Prince Moritz of Anhalt-Dessau (1712–1760), a German prince of the House of Ascania from the Anhalt-Dessau branch
 Moritz, Landgrave of Hesse (1926), the head of the House of Hesse, pretendant to the throne of Finland, son of Prince Philip, Landgrave of Hesse
 Moritz, Prince of Dietrichstein (1775–1864)
 Moritz Becker, American politician
 Moritz Benedikt (1849–1920), Jewish-Austrian newspaper editor
 Moritz Borman, film producer
 Moritz Michael Daffinger (1790–1849), Austrian miniature painter and sculptor
 Moritz Duschak (1815–1890), Moravian rabbi and writer
 Moritz Schlick, German philosopher and physicist
 Moritz von Schwind, Austrian painter
 Moritz Seider, German ice hockey player
 Moritz Steinla (1791–1858), German engraver
 Moritz Wagner (1813–1887), German explorer, collector, geographer and natural historian
 Moritz Wagner (basketball) (born 1997), German basketball player

Surname 
 A. F. Moritz (born 1947), American poet, teacher and scholar
 André Moritz (born 1986), Brazilian attacking midfielder
 Bruno Moritz (1900–?), German-Ecuadorian chess master
 Carl Moritz (1863–1944), German architect and real estate entrepreneur
 Christoph Moritz (born 1990), German footballer
 Elisabeth Moritz, mother of Catherine I of Russia
 Halvar Moritz, Swedish cross-country skier
  (born 1933), Austrian geodeticist
 Karl Philipp Moritz (1756–1793), German author, editor and essayist
 Julius L. Moritz (1830–1909) and Morris Moritz (about 1836–1903), German brothers in Los Angeles
 Louisa Moritz (born 1946), Cuban-born American actress
  (1860–1925), German painter
 Mathias Moritz (born 1988), German footballer
 Michael Moritz (born 1954), Welsh venture capitalist
 Nancy Moritz (born 1960), justice on the Kansas Supreme Court
 Neal H. Moritz (born 1959), American film producer
 Nils Moritz (born 1943), Swedish actor
  (born 1941), German sinologist
 Robert Moritz, musician
 Robert Edouard Moritz (1868–1940), German-American mathematician
 Paulus Moritz (1869–1942), German Roman Catholic cleric 
 Sabine Moritz (born 1969), German painter and graphic designer
 Theodore L. Moritz (1892–1982), Democratic member of the U.S. House of Representatives from Pennsylvania
 William Moritz (1941–2004), film historian
 Wilhelm Moritz (Luftwaffe officer) (1913–2010), German Luftwaffe ace
 Yunna Moritz (born 1937), Soviet and Russian poet

Fictional characters 
 a title character of Max and Moritz, an 1865 German-language illustrated story by Wilhelm Busch
 Moritz Stiefel, lead male role in the Broadway musical Spring Awakening
 Moritz Benayoun, human male doctor on the TV series Star Trek: Picard

Other uses 
 Moritz, Germany, a village and a former municipality, now part of the town of Zerbst in Saxony-Anhalt
 Moritz College of Law, a public law school at Ohio State University
 Moritz (beer), a Spanish (Catalan) beer brand, founded by Alsatian immigrant Louis Moritz Trautmann

See also 
 St. Moritz (disambiguation)
 Moriz, another given name and surname

German masculine given names
German-language surnames